Tillandsia pruinosa, is a species of flowering plant in the family Bromeliaceae. It is commonly known as the fuzzywuzzy airplant. This species is native to northern South America, Central America, southern Mexico, the West Indies and Florida.

Cultivars
 Tillandsia 'Chanza'
 Tillandsia 'Pruinariza'
 Tillandsia 'Sweet Chocolate'

References

pruinosa
Flora of Florida
Flora of Central America
Flora of Mexico
Flora of South America
Flora of the Caribbean
Plants described in 1797
Taxa named by John Gilbert Baker
Flora without expected TNC conservation status